Euthyrisellidae is a family of bryozoans belonging to the order Cheilostomatida.

Genera:
 Euthyrisell  Bassler, 1936
 Neoeuthyris Bretnall, 1921
 Pleurotoichus Levinsen, 1909
 Pseudoplatyglena Gordon & d'Hondt, 1997
 Tropidozoum Harmer, 1957

References

Cheilostomatida